Raymond de Vries (25 March 1965 – 2 November 2020) was a Dutch footballer who played as a winger.

Club career
After joining from hometown club FC Utrecht in 1986, de Vries scored 7 goals in 34 league matches for second tier-side Emmen.

He scored 12 goals in 65 league games for Vitesse and won promotion to the Eredivisie with them in 1989. He only played one game for them in the top flight.

Personal life
A lover of horror movies, de Vries died after a short illness in November 2020.

References

1965 births
2020 deaths
Footballers from Utrecht (city)
Association football wingers
Dutch footballers
FC Utrecht players
FC Emmen players
SBV Vitesse players
PEC Zwolle players
HVV Hollandia players
Eredivisie players
Eerste Divisie players